Chelcee Maria Grimes (born 8 May 1992) is an English singer, songwriter, television presenter, and footballer. She wrote songs for Kylie Minogue, Dua Lipa, Blackpink, Kesha, Olly Murs, Jonas Blue, Louisa, the Saturdays, and Tom Walker. Grimes also hosted several football television shows and was a commentator for the semi-finals of the Eurovision Song Contest 2021.

Early life
Chelcee Maria Grimes was born in Aigburth, Liverpool to Maria, her mother, and a father who died from a heart attack when she was a child. Grimes was raised by her mother and stepfather David, and moved to Wavertree to attend St Julie's Catholic High School, where she balanced playing football and performing music. After initially playing for Liverpool Ladies during her childhood, she decided to pursue a music career at the age of 16. During the same time period her sister was born.

Music career
Grimes signed a four-album deal with RCA Records at the age of 18, but was dropped a year later. Her first songwriting breakthrough was "Million Miles", which she co-wrote with Danish producer Cutfather for Australian singer Kylie Minogue's twelfth studio album Kiss Me Once (2014). She wrote the hook after Cutfather played the track for her. In 2014, Grimes won the award for "Best Up and Coming New Act" at the Juice FM Style Awards. She has written songs for Kesha, the Saturdays, Dua Lipa, Little Mix, Blackpink, Olly Murs, Jonas Blue, Louisa, and Tom Walker. Grimes wrote "11:11" about her biological father in 2016, which is performed by South Korean singer Taeyeon. The ballad is sung in Korean and received 50 million views on YouTube by December 2018. In 2018, Grimes released her first two songs, "Just Like That" and "I Need a Night Out", and collaborated with Jonas Blue on "Wild" from the latter's debut studio album Blue (2018). She co-wrote several songs for Dua Lipa since the latter signed her first recording contract, including "Kiss and Make Up" (2018) and "Love Again" (2021).

Artistry and influences
Grimes has described herself as a pop singer. She grew up listening to Jennifer Lopez, Beyoncé, Kanye West, Pink, Gwen Stefani, Eminem, Lady Gaga, Christina Aguilera, and Avril Lavigne. Grimes developed her songwriting skills through listening to Lady Gaga's debut studio album The Fame (2008).

Football career
Grimes' football career began when she began playing for Liverpool Ladies at the age of 10. After a brief hiatus to pursue a music career, she decided to return to football. As of September 2021, Grimes has played for Everton, Tottenham Hotspur, Tranmere Rovers, Fulham, and Merseyrail Ladies.

Broadcasting career
Grimes is a presenter for the BBC and COPA90, where she covered the 2019 FIFA Women's World Cup for the former. Since September 2019, Grimes is the co-presenter of Match of the Day spin-off show MOTDx, and hosted her own show on BBC Sport titled Chelcee Away. She commentated during the semi-final of Eurovision Song Contest 2021 for the United Kingdom. In July 2021, Grimes presented several mini-series for BT Sport including Para Football Adventures, and Watch Us Rise. Throughout 2022, she participated in several reality competition series such as Freeze the Fear with Wim Hof, and The Games.

Personal life
Grimes previously identified herself as bisexual in a 2019 interview with Gay Times, but considered herself to be a lesbian in 2021. She is the co-host of the BBC Sounds podcast Building Queertopia alongside Courtney Act, which is about the lifestyle of LGBT celebrities. Grimes also hosts her personal podcast entitled What We Coulda Been.

Discography

Singles

As lead artist

As featured artist

Songwriting credits

References

1992 births
Living people
Place of birth missing (living people)
Bisexual musicians
Bisexual sportspeople
British women singer-songwriters
English women's footballers
Everton F.C. (women) players
Footballers from Liverpool
Fulham L.F.C. players
LGBT association football players
British LGBT singers
Musicians from Liverpool
People from Aigburth
Tottenham Hotspur F.C. Women players
Tranmere Rovers L.F.C. players
20th-century LGBT people
21st-century LGBT people
Women's association footballers not categorized by position